The Bugatti Divo is a mid-engine track-focused sports car developed and manufactured by Bugatti Automobiles S.A.S. The car is named after French racing driver Albert Divo, who raced for Bugatti in the 1920s winning the Targa Florio race twice. It was revealed on 24 August 2018 at “The Quail – A Motorsports Gathering“ in California, United States.

Specifications and features

The car takes inspiration from the Bugatti Type 57SC Atlantic along with the Bugatti Vision Gran Turismo concept in terms of design and has track performance as its main focus. The car includes a redesigned exhaust system featuring quad exhaust pipes, a 1.8 metre wide fixed rear wing (23% wider than the retractable wing on the Chiron), a NACA duct on the roof that channels air to the rear of the car on a central fin and ultimately on the rear wing for improved downforce, a large front chin spoiler, more refined side skirts, larger air intakes on the front, new head lamps and tail lamps, a vent in the bonnet for improved radiator cooling and vents on the front wheel arches to cool the brakes.

The interior in the Divo is relatively similar to the more luxurious Chiron, but has Alcantara upholstery and carbon-fibre trim in order to save weight.

The engine, a quad-turbocharged W16 unit, is retained from the Chiron along with the 7-speed dual-clutch transmission.

Performance
The car is 8.0 seconds quicker than the Chiron around the Nardò test track according to the manufacturer and generates  of downforce at top speed,  more than the Chiron. The Divo lacks the top speed mode unlocked with a special key as present on the Chiron.

Production 
The production of the Divo is limited to 40 units and the car will be built alongside the Chiron at the Bugatti factory. All of the 40 cars were pre-sold before the public debut to Chiron owners through special invitation by the dealers. The Bugatti Divo sold out in its first day of availability. In April 2020, Divo entered its final phase of testing with deliveries beginning later in the year. The first car was delivered in August 2020. On July 23, 2021 the last Bugatti Divo was produced.

See also
 Bugatti Chiron
 Bugatti Vision Gran Turismo
 List of production cars by power output

References

External links 
 

Chiron
Cars introduced in 2018
Cars introduced in 2019
Rear mid-engine, all-wheel-drive vehicles
Sports cars
Coupés
Flagship vehicles